The Grossmont Union High School District (GUHSD) is a public school district located in eastern San Diego County, California, and serves high school, adult school, and Regional Occupational Program (ROP) students in the cities of El Cajon, Lemon Grove, and Santee; the unincorporated communities of Alpine, Casa de Oro, Crest, Dehesa, Dulzura, Jamul, Lakeside, Mount Helix, Rancho San Diego, and Spring Valley; most of La Mesa, and parts of San Diego.

Formed in June 1920, the union high school district is overseen by a five-member governing board and operates 13 high schools (nine regular, three charter, and one continuation); a regional occupational program (ROP); and special education and adult education services. The day-to-day operations are managed by the superintendent, who is appointed by the board.

The Grossmont Union High School District utilizes a strategic plan that includes a mission statement, district guidelines, core values, and annual goals and objectives. The district's schools are accredited by the Western Association of Schools and Colleges (WASC).

Four of the district's high schools—Helix, Mount Miguel, Santana, and Valhalla (twice)—have been recognized as a California Distinguished School by the California Department of Education.

In March 2001, the district and two of its high schools—Santana and Granite Hills—made nationwide headlines in the US when, in a span of seventeen days, a total of two students were killed and twenty students and two teachers were wounded when two students, in separate incidents, opened fire at their schools.

History
Grossmont Union High School District was formed in 1920 and its first high school, Grossmont High School, built in 1922, served the cities of La Mesa and El Cajon. At the time of its construction, this region of eastern San Diego County was much more rural and isolated from the city of San Diego. La Mesa and El Cajon were, in fact, only newly incorporated cities, as of 1912. Grossmont remained the region's only high school for 30 years. In 1939, Grossmont High School was rebuilt. Beginning in 1952, the school district underwent an expensive, rapid period of development to accommodate for the suburbanization and consequent growth in population of the area. Six more schools were established in a period of ten years. A further four schools were subsequently built. Most recently, the district opened Steele Canyon High School in Spring Valley in 2000.

CARD
There are many military families present in the school district. Marine Corps Air Station Miramar and Marine Corps Recruit Depot San Diego are both nearby. North of San Diego is Marine Corps Base Camp Pendleton.

In October 1982, the San Diego Committee Against Registration and the Draft (CARD), later renamed the Committee Opposed to Militarism and the Draft, sought to purchase advertising space from five student newspapers published by high schools within the district. CARD, a non-profit organization, provides counseling services to young men and women on alternatives to military service. Members include both students and non-students. The advertisement was intended to provide information to students on such alternatives.

Depicting a ghost-like figure, stating "Don't Let the Draft Blow You Away!" the advertisement contained the following statements:

Know Your Rights
Know Your Choices!

If the draft starts tomorrow, you
could be in boot camp 11 days later.

Call or Write
Committee Against
Registration and the Draft

In November 1982, Acting Assistant Superintendent Bob King issued a directive instructing that all principals reject CARD's requests. In January 1983, CARD filed an administrative claim with the governing board so as to reverse the Superintendent's decision. The board rejected the claim in February and on March 16, 1983, CARD filed a lawsuit against the board, alleging that the board's actions and policies had deprived CARD of its rights under the First and Fourteenth Amendments to the United States Constitution.

In June 1986, the Ninth Circuit Court of Appeals stated that the question of voluntary and compulsory military service is a controversial political issue, ruling that if a school establishes a forum for one side to prevent its views, it must provide equal access to opponents. CARD v. GUHSD has since become a major legal precedent with regards to military recruitment. In the nine Western states within the boundaries of the Ninth Circuit, the ruling can be cited by counter-militarism activists in order to demand the opportunity to address students in public schools, an opportunity previously granted solely to recruiters and the Selective Service System. In addition, the Court's ruling clarifies the legal definition of school newspapers, mainly as "limited public forums." The governing board had argued that the newspapers were "non-public" and therefore completely under its control.

March 2001 school shootings

On March 5, 2001, Charles "Andy" Williams, 15, shot and killed two students and wounded 13 others at Santana High School in Santee. On August 15, 2002, Williams was sentenced to 50 years to life in prison for the shootings. His defense attorneys had filed a 200-page report arguing for more lenient sentencing. The report included excerpts from Williams' interview with University of California, Davis psychiatrist Dr. Charles Scott. Williams told Scott that taunting and bullying by his peers had depressed him and led him to consider suicide. He also told Scott that he thought someone would stop him from bringing his father's .22 calibre gun to school.

Less than three weeks later, on March 22, 2001, Jason Hoffman, 18, armed with a .22 calibre handgun and a 12-gauge pump-action shotgun, shot and wounded three students and two teachers at Granite Hills High School in nearby El Cajon. The shooting ended in a gun battle with local police near the campus administration building. Before the incident, Hoffman allegedly made references to the 1999 massacre at Columbine High School in Littleton, Colorado. Hoffman reportedly had a history of mental illness and discipline problems and was ordered to attend an anger management class several years before. The San Diego Union-Tribune also reported that Hoffman had been rejected by the Navy a day before the shooting because he was 25 pounds overweight, had a skin condition and had been convicted of assault. After pleading guilty to one count of premeditated attempted murder and five counts of assault, Hoffman hanged himself in his segregation cell at the county jail on October 29, 2001.

2006 immigration policy protests
Students throughout San Diego County joined the nationwide protests over immigration policies in March 2006. Hundreds of students walked out of El Cajon Valley High School and marched in the streets carrying signs and flags. Granite Hills High School went into morning lockdowns to prevent students from coming into contact with marchers from the neighboring school. Student walkouts also occurred at Mount Miguel High School and Monte Vista High School.

GUHSD sent out an automated phone message to parents, urging them to keep their children at school. The bilingual message warned that students who are arrested could face a $250 fine. The district cautioned parents that any students who missed class or left the campus without permission would be marked truant and receive zero grades.

Charter schools
In 1998, Helix High School became the district's first charter high school. Steele Canyon became the second charter school on July 1, 2007. Liberty Charter High School was founded in 2008. Although affiliated with GUHSD, Helix High School has its own independent school board. Liberty Charter is operated by Literacy First inc.

Schools

The GUHSD has the following thirteen high school campuses (listed in order of year opened):
1922 – Grossmont High School, La Mesa/El Cajon
1952 – Helix High School (Originally a member now a Sponsored charter), La Mesa
1955 – El Cajon Valley High School, El Cajon
1957 – Mount Miguel High School, Spring Valley
1959 – El Capitan High School, Lakeside
1960 – Granite Hills High School, El Cajon
1961 – Monte Vista High School, Spring Valley
1965 – Santana High School, Santee
1972 – Chaparral High School (continuation), El Cajon
1974 – Valhalla High School, El Cajon
1987 – West Hills High School, Santee
2000 – Steele Canyon High School (charter), Spring Valley
2008 – Liberty Charter High School (sponsored charter), La Mesa
2015 – IDEA Center High School (alternative), El Cajon

Programs and services
In addition to its high schools, the districts operates:
Grossmont Middle College High School, Grossmont College, El Cajon
East County Career Center
East County Regional Education Center (ECREC)
East County Regional Occupational Program (ROP)
Foothills Adult School
Grossmont Work Training Center
REACH Academy (Continuation)/ Frontier (special education)
Viking Center (special education – severely disabled)
Work Training Center (Job skills training for special needs students)

Governing board and superintendent
Governing board

Chris Fite, member (elected 2016)
Gary Woods, member (elected 2008)
Robert Shield, member (elected 2006)
Elva Salinas, member (elected 2016)
Jim Kelly, member (elected 2002)

Superintendent
Jo Ann Smith, superintendent (appointed 1990)
Ms. Smith was an internal hire.

Thomas Godley, superintendent (appointed 1997)
Mr. Godley was a former superintendent of the San Marino Unified School District.

Granger Ward, Superintendent (appointed 1999)
Mr. Ward worked as an administrator for New York City Schools.

Terry Ryan, Superintendent (appointed 2003)
Mr. Ryan worked for the County Office.

Robert Collins, superintendent (appointed 2007)
Mr. Collins had worked 39 years for LA Unified.

Ralf Swenson, superintendent (appointed 2010)
Mr. Swenson was the superintendent of the Nevada Joint Union High School District in metropolitan Sacramento.

Tolerance policies

In the mid-1980s, sophomore Karen Davis requested that a district policy preventing girls from participating in "contact sports" (e.g. wrestling, football and boxing) be changed. It is "outright discrimination," Davis argued, to exclude any capable girl from playing any particular sport. Initially, the board rejected her request, voting 4–1 in favor of prohibiting Davis from playing on the Helix High School football team. Davis threatened to sue the board and, in September 1985, the state legislative council ruled that she should be allowed to play on the team. Finally, the board changed the policy to allow girls to try out for contact sports.

In 1999, the school board approved expanding the district's anti-discrimination policy to include sexual orientation.

In 2002, the GUHSD board decided to censor a film promoting tolerance of gay, lesbian and bisexual students.

In October 2007, Governor Schwarzenegger signed an anti-discrimination law aiming to provide protection for gay, lesbian and transgender students. The following month, four of the five board members joined a federal lawsuit that challenged the new state education law as "unconstitutionally vague and a violation of privacy rights."

The school board publicly voted in 2008 on a resolution endorsing Proposition 8 which would effectively ban same-sex marriage in California. The Governing Board voted 4–0 with 1 abstention by board member Hoy (who cited that the proposition had nothing to do with schools) to endorse the amendment of the California State Constitution. Many students, teachers and community members spoke out against the boards action during the public comment period. They felt the message they were sending to students was one of discrimination and felt the support of prop 8 had nothing to do with the education and students of the district. Grossmont Union School board was the only school board in the State to make such a resolution in support of prop. 8

Discipline

Advanced placement
Most high schools in the district offer advanced placement (AP) courses. The percent of students in AP courses varies from school to school.

Demographic profile
With 2,300 employees and hundreds more hourly employees, GUHSD is the largest employer of eastern San Diego County. GUHSD is also very ethnically diverse. Of the 24,000 students that attend schools in the district, approximately 53% are white, while 47% identify as one or more of the following: Latino, African-American, Asian, Filipino, Pacific Islander, and Native American. At the school level, these statistics change significantly. In fact, some schools comprise minority-majority populations. While non-Hispanic whites represent over 75% of the Santana High School student body, they make up only 16% at Mount Miguel High School.

A 1992 UC Santa Barbara-University of British Columbia-University of Edinburgh study examined the extent and impact of ethnic and racial segregation on the achievement gap in California's six largest school districts, including GUHSD, during the 1988–1989 school year. Within these districts, the study found that GUHSD had the highest concentration of white students, while San Francisco Unified School District and Los Angeles Unified School District had the lowest. The study suggested that such widespread segregation may have led to significant differences in achievement levels across schools and among ethnic groups.

Average class size in the district varies by grade level, subject area and school. The district, however, reports that it provides staffing resources at a ratio of 35 students to one teacher. Based on audited financial statements for the 2006–2007 fiscal year, the district spent an average of $9,030 to educate each student.

Socioeconomic backgrounds vary across student populations as well. The district reports relatively large percentages of socioeconomically disadvantaged students at several schools. During the 2005–2006 school year, 50% of students were considered disadvantaged at Mount Miguel High School, while 62%, 48% and 42% were deemed so at El Cajon Valley High School, Helix High School and Monte Vista High School, respectively. Valhalla High School had the lowest proportion of socioeconomically disadvantaged students, with only 12%.

Chaparral High School is the main continuation/alternative school of the district. Comprehensive schools may refer students to Chaparral for reasons involving poor attendance, lack of academic success and/or behavioral issues.

Feeder school districts
Cajon Valley Union School District
La Mesa-Spring Valley School District
Lakeside Union School District
Lemon Grove School District
Santee School District

Notable alumni
Khalif Barnes, Mount Miguel, 2000, National Football League offensive tackle, Jacksonville Jaguars
Leon Bender, Santana, 1992, National Football League defensive lineman, Oakland Raiders
Reggie Bush, Helix, 2002, National Football League running back, New Orleans Saints
Nick Cannon, Monte Vista, 1998, rapper and actor
Chuck Cecil, Helix, former National Football League strong safety for the Green Bay Packers, Arizona Cardinals and Houston Oilers, Currently safeties and nickelbacks coach for the Tennessee Titans
Eric Close, Valhalla, 1985, actor
Sharon Davis, Santana, 1972, former First Lady of California
Karl Dorrell, Helix, 1981, college football head coach, University of California, Los Angeles Bruins
Terry Forster, Santana, 1970, retired Major League Baseball relief pitcher, Chicago White Sox, Los Angeles Dodgers
Geoff Geary, Grossmont, 1994, Major League Baseball relief pitcher, Philadelphia Phillies
Brian Giles, Granite Hills, 1989, Major League Baseball right fielder, San Diego Padres and previously Cleveland Indians and Pittsburgh Pirates, brother of Marcus Giles
Marcus Giles, Granite Hills, 1996, Major League Baseball second baseman, San Diego Padres, brother of Brian Giles
Dennis Hopper, Helix, 1954, actor and film director
Jimmie Johnson, Granite Hills, 1993, NEXTEL Cup Champion
David Leisure, Grossmont, 1968, actor, Empty Nest and fictional Isuzu spokesman Joe Isuzu
Greg Louganis, Valhalla, 1976, former four-time Olympic gold medalist in diving
Mark Malone, El Cajon Valley, 1976, sportscaster and former National Football League quarterback, Pittsburgh Steelers, San Diego Chargers, and New York Jets
Kevin McCadam, El Capitan, 1997, Virginia Tech, National Football League, Atlanta Falcons, Carolina Panthers
Glen Morgan, El Cajon Valley, television producer, writer, and film director, often with business partner James Wong
Ellen Ochoa, Grossmont, 1975, astronaut
Mary Jo Ondrechen, Mount Miguel, 1970, scientist, educator, community activist
Hayden Penn,Santana, 2002, Major League Baseball pitcher, Baltimore Orioles
Julia Schultz, Granite Hills, 1997, model and actress
Brian Sipe, Grossmont, former National Football League MVP quarterback, Cleveland Browns and United States Football League New Jersey Generals and Jacksonville Bulls
Alex Smith, Helix, National Football League quarterback, San Francisco 49ers
Shane Spencer, Granite Hills, 1990, Nippon Professional Baseball outfielder, Hanshin Tigers and previously Major League Baseball New York Yankees, Toronto Blue Jays, Texas Rangers, Cleveland Indians, and New York Mets
Stephen Strasburg, West Hills, 2006 the "most-hyped pick in draft history" selected first overall in the 2009 Major League Baseball draft by the Washington Nationals
Frederick W. Sturckow, Grossmont, 1978, astronaut
Jim Tatum, Santana High School, 1985 drafted by San Diego Padres
Bill Walton, Helix, 1970, sportscaster and former National Basketball Association Hall of Fame center, Portland Trail Blazers and San Diego Clippers (now the Los Angeles Clippers)
James Wong, El Cajon Valley, television producer, writer and film director, often with business partner Glen Morgan

Notable faculty
Cathy Zemlick, 2001, Founder GMCHS
Roy Anthony, Valhalla, 1995 California Teacher of the Year, Instrumental Music 9–12
Robin Ballarin, West Hills, 2004 San Diego County Teacher of the Year
Marjorie Sue Blass, 1980 San Diego County Teacher of the Year
Barry Bosworth, 1994 San Diego County Teacher of the Year
Margaret Ruth Chaimson, 1981 San Diego County Teacher of the Year
Nadia Maria Quintana Davies, 1982 San Diego County Teacher of the Year
Charles Robert Downing, 1985 San Diego County Teacher of the Year
Susan Emerson, 1997 San Diego County Teacher of the Year
Lewis V. Freed, 1985 San Diego County Teacher of the Year
Myrra L. Lee, Helix, 1977 National Teacher of the Year
June M. Mott, 1979 San Diego County Teacher of the Year
Jane Collins Schaffer, 1982 San Diego County Teacher of the Year
Elinor Van Den Akker, 1975 San Diego County Teacher of the Year

See also

List of school districts in California by county
List of school districts in San Diego County, California

References

Additional references
California Teachers of the Year Program award winners for 1990 through 2005, cde.ca.gov
History of the Schools of El Cajon Valley, k12.ca.us
List of California Distinguished Schools in San Diego County, cde.ca.gov
San Diego County Teachers of the Year award winners 1974–2006, k12.ca.us
Western Association of Schools and Colleges Directory of Accredited Schools 2005–2006 (PDF), acswasc.org

External links

School districts established in 1920
School districts in San Diego County, California
Education in El Cajon, California
La Mesa, California
Lemon Grove, California
Santee, California
1920 establishments in California